NUAK family SNF1-like kinase 1 also known as AMPK-related protein kinase 5 (ARK5) is an enzyme that in humans is encoded by the NUAK1 gene.

Function
Acts as a regulator of cellular senescence and cellular ploidy by mediating phosphorylation of 'Ser-464' of LATS1, thereby controlling its stability. Controls cell adhesion by regulating activity of the myosin protein phosphatase 1 (PP1) complex.

Clinical significance
ARK5 is important in tumor malignancy and invasiveness.

Research findings
ARK5 is often overexpressed in multiple myeloma cell lines.
ARK5 promotes tumor cell survival under regulation by Akt.

ARK5 increases MT1-MMP production. (MT1-MMP activates MMP-2 and MMP-9 which are involved in tumor metastasis.)

As a drug target
ON123300 (a CDK4 inhibitor), also inhibits ARK5 and reduces proliferation of multiple myeloma and mantle cell lymphoma cell lines.

Interactions
NUAK1 has been shown to interact with USP9X and Ubiquitin C.

References

Further reading

EC 2.7.11